Sir Ernest Gray (27 August 1856 – 6 May 1932) was a British educational reformer and Conservative politician.

Early life and educational work
The son of William Gray, he attended primary school and St John's Training College, Battersea. On completion of his training, he worked as an elementary school teacher and science lecturer. He married Florence Caroline Garside in 1883. By 1894 he had become headmaster of St Gabriel's School, Pimlico and was elected as president of the National Union of Teachers. He received an honorary degree from the University of Oxford in the same year. He later spent many years as secretary to the education committee of the union, and was joint editor of a number of education handbooks. He served as a member of the Consultative Committee of the Board of Education from 1900 to 1908. He was appointed an Officer de l’Instruction Publique by the French government for services to education. 
Gray held a commission in the Volunteer Force and the successor Territorial Force of the British Army, rising to the rank of major in the 6th Battalion, Essex Regiment.

Politics
Politically, Gray was a Conservative, and in 1895 he was chosen by the party to contest the constituency of West Ham North. Gray had the full support of the National Union of Teachers, and was able to unseat the Liberal Member of Parliament, magazine publisher Archibald Grove. He retained the seat at the 1900 election, but was defeated in 1906. He made an unsuccessful attempt to regain the West Ham North seat in January 1910. At the next general election in December 1910 he contested the Lancashire seat of Accrington but failed to be elected.

In the meantime, Gray had been elected to the London County Council as a member of the Conservative-backed Municipal Reform Party. In 1907 the Municipal Reformers gained control of the council, and Gray was elected to represent Hoxton. At the next council elections in 1910 he became a councillor for Brixton, holding the seat until 1925. He was vice chairman of the council in 1915–1916.

He returned to parliament at the 1918 general election, having received the "coalition coupon", and was elected as Coalition Conservative member of parliament for Accrington. He was defeated at the next general election in 1922, when the seat was gained by the Labour Party.

Later life
Gray retired from the London County Council in 1925, and was knighted for "political and public services" in the same year. He died in Hampstead, aged 73, in May 1932 and was cremated at Golders Green.

References

External links
 

1856 births
1932 deaths
Conservative Party (UK) MPs for English constituencies
National Union of Teachers-sponsored MPs
UK MPs 1895–1900
UK MPs 1900–1906
UK MPs 1918–1922
Members of London County Council
Knights Bachelor
Municipal Reform Party politicians
Essex Regiment officers
Volunteer Force officers
Heads of schools in London
Trade unionists from London
Presidents of the National Union of Teachers
Members of the Parliament of the United Kingdom for constituencies in Lancashire